Mehrangiz Morovvati (born 1962) is an Iranian politician.

Morovvati was born in Khalkhal, Ardabil Province. He is a member of the 2000 and 2004 Islamic Consultative Assembly from the electorate of Khalkhal and Kowsar.

References

People from Khalkhal, Iran
Deputies of Khalkhal and Kowsar
Living people
1962 births
Members of the 6th Islamic Consultative Assembly
Members of the 7th Islamic Consultative Assembly
National Trust Party (Iran) politicians
21st-century Iranian women politicians
21st-century Iranian politicians